Athisaya Penn is a 1959 Indian Tamil-language romantic comedy film, produced and directed by M. V. Raman. The film stars Akkineni Nageswara Rao and Vyjayanthimala, with music composed by S. M. Subbaiah Naidu. It is a remake of the Hindi film Aasha (1957). The film was released on 6 March 1959.

Plot 

The film begins with Muthuraja (Sarangapani), a rich man and a Carnatic music lover, who fails to manage his estate, his son Manivannan (Akkineni Nageswara Rao), is a good-hearted person and always helps poor people, even though he is from rich Zamindar family and also has no interest in the family business. It is left to Muthuraja's sister Maragatham (M. S. Draupathi) to look after the business affairs and her son Raju (Manohar), who lives in Madras, is a wastrel. Maragatham sends Manivannan to Madras so he can be educated by Raju. While booking a room at a hotel in Madras, Manivannan comes across Lally (Madhuri Devi), who is unable to clear her hotel bill. He takes pity on her and clears the bill. Raju, in charge of training for Manivannan, doesn't quite care about him and lets him do as he wishes. One day, Manivannan goes to watch a dance drama in a college hostel and ends up meeting a young dancer, Nirmala (Vyjayanthimala), with whom he falls in love. Once both of them go for a hunt in the jungle, Raju meets an old man who demands he marry his jilted daughter. Raju murders him and complications result when Manivannan is charged. Finally, Manivannan and his lover Nirmala prevail in the truth and show that Raju is guilty and the movie ends with the marriage of Manivannan and Nirmala.

Cast

Production 
Athisaya Penn is a remake of the 1957 Hindi-language film Aasha, and has both the lead actress Vyjayanthimala and director M. V. Raman returning. The film was shot in Gevacolor, with some portions in Technicolor.

Soundtrack 
The music was composed by S. M. Subbaiah Naidu. The song "Eena Meena Deeka" is based on the song of the same name from Aasha.

Release and reception 
Athisaya Penn was released on 6 March 1959. Kanthan of Kalki called the pre-interval portions better than the post-interval ones.

References

External links 
 

1950s Tamil-language films
1959 films
1959 romantic comedy films
Films directed by M. V. Raman
Films with screenplays by Javar Seetharaman
Indian romantic comedy films
Tamil remakes of Hindi films